Miss Universe Japan is a national Beauty pageant in Japan to select an official candidate for the Miss Universe pageant.

Since 2018, the national director of Miss Universe Japan is Hiroko Mima.

History
When the Miss Universe Japan pageant was founded in 1998, it was run by French national director Ines Ligron. Until 2007, the organisation managed to produce one winner, two top 5 runners-up and one top 15 semifinalist at the Miss Universe pageant. Ligron was catapulted to the international spotlight when Riyo Mori won the second Miss Universe crown for Japan in 2007. In 2009, Ligron left the organisation which resulted in a different team now leading the organisation.

National directors
1952 Miss Japan - Yoshinaga (Japanese-American Press)
1998 Miss Universe Japan - Inès Ligron (WCBA)
2010 Miss Universe Japan - Izumi Toda and Akihiro Yoshida (HDR Corporation)
2018 Miss Universe Japan - Hiroko Mima

International crowns 
 Two – Miss Universe winners: 
 Riyo Mori (2007)
 Akiko Kojima (1959)

Gallery of winners

Titleholders

The Miss Japan pageant existed from 1952 to 1995. During that period, the pageant managed to produce a winner and three top 5 finalists at the Miss Universe pageant. In 1959, Akiko Kojima claimed the first crown for Japan. After a top 12 semifinalist placement in 1975, Japan managed to place only one more time prior to 1995, when Mizuho Sakaguchi took fourth place in 1988. In 1998, the Miss Universe Japan pageant acquired the Miss Universe license. The winner of Miss Universe Japan (MUJ) represents her country at Miss Universe. On occasion, when the winner does not qualify (due to age) for either contest, a runner-up is sent.

See also 

 Miss Universe
 Miss World Japan
 Miss International Japan
 Miss Earth Japan
 Miss Japan
 Miss Nippon

References

External links
Official website

Japan
Beauty pageants in Japan
Recurring events established in 1998
1998 establishments in Japan
Japanese awards